Nedžmedin Memedi (Macedonian: Неџмедин Мемеди) (born 20 March 1966) is a retired Albanian football midfielder from Macedonia.

International career
He made his senior debut for Macedonia in an October 1993 friendly match away against Slovenia, which was his country's first ever official match, and got 32 caps and 2 goals in total. His final international was a July 2000 friendly against Azerbaijan.

References

External links
 Football Federation of Macedonia profile

1966 births
Living people
Albanian footballers from North Macedonia
Association football midfielders
Macedonian footballers
North Macedonia international footballers
FK Sloga Jugomagnat players
FK Sileks players
FK Vardar players
Macedonian First Football League players